Robiginitalea biformata is a Gram-negative, chemoheterotrophic and non-motile bacterium from the genus of Robiginitalea which has been isolated from the Sargasso Sea.

References

Flavobacteria
Bacteria described in 2004